Hydrangea involucrata is a species of flowering plant in the family Hydrangeaceae, native to Japan and Taiwan.

The Latin involucrata means "with a ring of bracts surrounding several flowers", referring to the fringe of sterile florets.

Hydrangea involucrata is cultivated as a garden plant, and has produced several cultivars.

References

involucrata
Flora of Taiwan
Flora of Japan